Nadezhda Wijenberg (born Nadezhda Alexeevna Ilyina on 2 April 1964 in Kanash) is a long-distance runner from Russia, who got the Dutch nationality in 1999 by marrying her coach Ger Wijenberg from the Netherlands.

Nadezhda "Nadja" Wijenberg lives in Schinnen, Limburg, and ran her personal best (2:28:45) in the Eindhoven Marathon, on 10 October 1999. That performance gave her a ticket for the 2000 Summer Olympics in Sydney, Australia, where she finished in 22nd place. She is a one-time national champion in the women's 5000 metres. She won the Lisbon Half Marathon 1993  and the Parelloop 10K in race in the Netherlands in 1997.

Achievements

References

External links 
 

1964 births
Living people
Dutch female long-distance runners
Dutch female marathon runners
Russian female long-distance runners
Russian female marathon runners
Olympic athletes of the Netherlands
Athletes (track and field) at the 2000 Summer Olympics
Russian emigrants to the Netherlands
People from Chuvashia
People from Schinnen
CIS Athletics Championships winners
Sportspeople from Chuvashia
20th-century Dutch women
21st-century Dutch women
20th-century Russian women
21st-century Russian women
Sportspeople from Limburg (Netherlands)